Alpine skiing at the 2020 Winter Youth Olympics took place at the Les Diablerets a ski resort located in Ormont-Dessus, Switzerland, from 10 to 15 January 2020.

Medal summary

Medal table

Medalists

Boys' events

Girls' events

Mixed events

Qualification
A total of 160 skiers qualified to compete (80 per gender). A NOC could enter a maximum of six skiers (three per gender). The top seven NOC's in the Marc Hodler trophy qualified the maximum six athletes, along with the host nation. All other nations scoring points qualified four athletes (two per gender). All remaining quotas were awarded to NOC's indicating interest and each NOC entered a max of one per gender. Quotas were officially awarded on December 9, 2019.

 NOC has received less quota than the calculated quota

Summary

References

External links
Results Book – Alpine skiing

 
2020 in alpine skiing
2020
2020 Winter Youth Olympics events
Youth Olympics